The Montauk Branch is a rail line owned and operated by the Long Island Rail Road in the U.S. state of New York. The branch runs the length of Long Island, 115 miles (185 km) from Long Island City on the west to Montauk on the east. However, in LIRR maps and schedules for public use, the term Montauk Branch refers to the line east of Babylon; the line west of there is covered by Babylon Branch schedules, and a few Montauk Branch trains operate via the Main Line west of Babylon due to increased track capacities.

Route description

Lower Montauk

The westernmost portion of the Montauk Branch in Queens, known as the "Lower Montauk," runs between the Long Island City and Jamaica stations, mostly at street level with grade crossings. Just east of the Long Island City station, the abandoned Montauk Cutoff merges with the branch. The Lower Montauk Branch had nine stations, four of which were closed by 1940. The remaining five stations (Richmond Hill, Glendale, Fresh Pond, Haberman, and Penny Bridge) were closed on March 13, 1998, due to low ridership and incompatibility with then-new C3 bi-level coach cars that can only use high platforms (only Richmond Hill had an actual platform; the other four stations' platforms were just pavement strips beside the tracks). After these stations closed, the LIRR continued to use the Lower Montauk to operate non-stop trains between Jamaica and Long Island City rather than divert them to the Main Line; there were only two such trains at the time of the 1998 station closures, one westbound in the morning, and one eastbound in the evening. These two trains were re-routed north to Hunterspoint Avenue in 2012, effectively ceasing passenger train service on the Lower Montauk. Soon after, full control of the Lower Montauk was transferred to the New York and Atlantic Railway for freight operations.

The New York City Department of Transportation has periodically floated proposals to repurpose the Lower Montauk Branch for rapid transit operations. In 1984, the Department studied an option to connect the branch to the New York City Subway through a proposed connection to the IND 63rd Street Line in Long Island City. This proposal was unpopular in the communities surrounding the branch. In 2017, the Department studied a plan to operate light rail service on the Lower Montauk Branch.

After Penn Station opened in 1910 the Lower Montauk became the freight route, and when the present Jamaica station opened in 1913 the two Lower Montauk tracks continued past the south side of the station, south of Hall tower and the south Union Hall Street platform and on to Holban Yard. Those two tracks now carry trains to/from the Hillside Facility that has replaced Holban Yard; they can also carry nonstop Main Line trains past Jamaica station. East from Jamaica the Montauk Branch runs between the Main Line tracks (with two usually westward Main Line tracks north of it and two eastward tracks south of it) until just west of Hillside Facility.  At  the Montauk Branch rises to cross above the other tracks and turns southeast.   At  it swings parallel to the Atlantic Branch between its Laurelton and Rosedale stations.  The Montauk Branch east of Jamaica is 0.7 mile longer than the Atlantic.

Babylon Branch

The portion between Jamaica and Babylon stations has been electrified since 1925, and electric trains to Babylon are often identified as a separate service, the Babylon Branch. It is grade-separated on embankments or elevated structures. From Babylon east to Montauk, diesel-electric or dual-mode electric/diesel-electric locomotives haul trains of passenger coaches.

The Montauk Line has heavy ridership and frequent service as far as Patchogue station and commuter service as far as Speonk station. In the summer, with travelers going out to The Hamptons, Fire Island and other beaches, additional service is operated to the far eastern terminal at Montauk, such as the Cannonball, a Friday afternoon train departing from Penn Station (originally Hunterspoint Avenue) and running non-stop to Westhampton station in Westhampton. The Montauk Branch, along with the parallel Atlantic Branch, spawns three subsidiary branches: the West Hempstead Branch, Far Rockaway Branch, and Long Beach Branch.

The electrified portion of the Montauk Branch ends in the village of Babylon. Some of the diesel trains on the Montauk branch begin or end their runs at Babylon station, connecting with electric trains there. Other Montauk diesel trains operate into New York City, to Jamaica station; Hunterspoint Avenue or Long Island City stations in Long Island City; or Penn Station.

East of Babylon
The terminal stations in diesel territory, east of Babylon, are Patchogue, Speonk, and Montauk. The Montauk Branch is double-tracked from just east of Long Island City (where there is a short segment of single track) all the way through Babylon, becoming single track at Y Interlocking east of the Sayville station. Some Montauk Branch diesel trains operate west to NYC via the diesel-only Central Branch, joining the Main Line east of Bethpage station.  Only a few actually run via the Montauk Branch west of Babylon, under normal conditions on the Main Line.

The Montauk was home to the last tower in North America that regularly used "hooping" train operations: PD Tower, in Patchogue. "Hooping" is the transfer of instructions to the engineer and conductor by attaching the folded orders to the "hoop", a rod several feet long with a loop at the end that is passed from the ground to a moving train by catching the loop on one's arm. The last train to get hooped at PD was train 2730 on May 6, 2006.

History
Currently, the Montauk Branch intersects with the Bushwick Branch, Bay Ridge Branch, West Hempstead Branch, and Central Branch, as well as the Main Line at Long Island City and Jamaica and the Atlantic Branch at Jamaica and Valley Stream; the Far Rockaway Branch and Long Beach Branch are connected via the Atlantic Branch at Valley Stream. In the past, junctions existed with the Rockaway Beach Branch (a quarter mile east of Woodhaven Boulevard), Southern Hempstead Branch (Valley Stream to Hempstead), Manorville Branch (Eastport to Manorville on the Main Line), and Sag Harbor Branch (Bridgehampton to Sag Harbor). In early times, the Scoot ran frequently between Greenport on the North Fork, "around the horn" on the Manorville Branch, and east to Sag Harbor. In their day, both of those villages were very busy, bustling ports.

Formation and early days: 1860s to 1925

The South Side Railroad of Long Island built the line from Bushwick, Brooklyn to Patchogue in the 1860s, and completed the new line to Long Island City in 1870. With the reorganization of the South Side as the Southern Railroad of Long Island in 1874 and its lease by the LIRR in 1876, this line became the Southern Railroad Division, Southern Railroad of Long Island Division, or simply Southern Division. Effective Sunday, June 25, 1876, all Southern Division passenger trains were rerouted to use the LIRR main line from Berlin Junction (west of Jamaica) to Rockaway Junction, and the LIRR's Rockaway Branch to Springfield Junction, where it crossed the Southern. This change resulted in the closure of the Southern's Berlin, Beaver Street (Jamaica), Locust Avenue, and Springfield stations. The old line between Jamaica and Springfield, which became freight-only, was renamed the Old Southern Road. The Southern was reorganized as the Brooklyn and Montauk Railroad in 1879, and on March 14, 1880, the name was changed from the Southern Division to the Montauk Division. Thus the old South Side Railroad, except between Jamaica and Springfield Junction, was now the Montauk Division.

The LIRR opened the Sag Harbor Branch, including the present Montauk Branch from Eastport to Bridgehampton, on June 8, 1870. On July 27, 1881, after the South Side became part of the LIRR, its line – then the Montauk Division – was extended east to the Sag Harbor Branch at Eastport. The Sag Harbor Branch east of Eastport became part of the Montauk Division, and the old line from Manor (Manorville) to Eastport became the Manor Branch. An extension to Montauk, splitting off the old Sag Harbor Branch at Bridgehampton, opened to Amagansett on June 1, 1895 and to Montauk by September, and the line between Bridgehampton and Sag Harbor reverted to the old Sag Harbor Branch name.

Babylon electrification: 1925 to present
Electrification of the Montauk Division from Jamaica to Babylon was completed on May 20, 1925, and normal operation began the next day. The Central Extension between Bethpage and Babylon was reopened for freight trains that had run via the Montauk Division.

The Montauk station was initially near the center of a sleepy fishing village at the north end of Fort Pond (where Austin Corbin built a pier in his unsuccessful effort to have trans-Atlantic ships dock there.) The Great Hurricane of 1938 devastated the terminus area and tore up sections of the roadbed. The population center then moved two miles (3 km) to the south, away from the station.

1998 saw the closure of three lightly used stations: Center Moriches, Quogue, and Southampton College. Southampton College was temporarily reinstated for the 2004 and 2018 U.S. Open tournaments at the nearby Shinnecock Hills Golf Club, along with a steel walkway over Montauk Highway. At the conclusion of the tournament, the walkway was dismantled and the temporary platform was removed.

On April 16, 2019, New York State Assemblyman Fred Thiele announced that funding to design improvements on the Montauk Branch would likely be included in the 2019–2020 state budget. The funding would be used by the LIRR to design three passing sidings to be installed on the line in single-track territory between Speonk and Montauk. The installation of passing sidings would allow for increased service on the South Fork Commuter Connection. MTA President and CEO Pat Foye said that improvements to the Montauk Branch were identified in the LIRR's request for the MTA' s Twenty-Year Needs Assessment.

Stations

West Hempstead Branch trains split off after St. Albans. Babylon Branch trains terminate at Babylon, while Montauk Branch trains continue beyond. Many non-electric Montauk Branch trains that run express between Jamaica and Babylon run via the Main Line and Central Branch, with one rush hour roundtrip serving  and  stations.

References

External links

Long Island Rail Road branches
Transportation in Queens, New York
Transportation in Nassau County, New York
Transportation in Suffolk County, New York